The women's heptathlon event at the 1991 Pan American Games was held in Havana, Cuba on 10 and 11 August.

Results

References

Athletics at the 1991 Pan American Games
1991
Pan